Chu Ming Silveira (April 4, 1939 – June 18, 1997) was a Brazilian architect and designer, creator of the Orelhão telephone booth.

Early life
Chu Ming Silveira was born in Shanghai on April 4, 1941 to Chu Chen and Shui Young Queen. She was the second of four siblings.[1] Her father was a civil engineer who served in Chiang Kai-Shek’s Nationalist military against the Communists during the Chinese Civil War. After the Communist victory in 1949, her family faced violent persecution and repression for being on the Nationalists’ side, which led her father to move the family to Hong Kong, where they stayed for a few months in hopes of eventually making it to America.[2] In 1950, her family traveled from Hong Kong to Brazil on a three-month long voyage by ship. They initially arrived in Rio de Janeiro, then settled down in São Paulo, in the Bairro Pinheiros. Once in Brazil, Chu Chen and Shui Young Queen decided to baptize their children as Catholics with Western names. At the age of 9, Chu Ming was christened as Veronica.[4]

Education
Chu Ming attended the Mackenzie University, in São Paulo, and graduated with a Master’s degree in Architecture in 1964.[4]

Personal life
In 1964, Chu Ming’s parents moved to Manaus, one of the main financial, corporate and economic centers of the North Region of Brazil. There, they founded Loja Oriente, which would later become an import and export company for refined products from China.[4]
In 1968, Chu Ming married the Brazilian engineer Clóvis Silveira. They had two children, Djan in April 1971 and Alan in October 1976.
She passed away of unknown reasons on June 18, 1997, in São Paulo at the age of 56, as a naturalized Brazilian citizen.[1]

Career

In 1965, Chu Ming opened her own architecture studio, and a year later in 1966, she joined the Companhia Telefônica Brasileira (CTB) in São Paulo as an architect, where she was in charge of the supervision and coordination of building projects for the Telephone Centers and Service Stations, as well as renovation works, until 1968.[2] 
Between 1968 and 1972, Chu Ming was Director of the Projects Department at CTB.

Pain Point
In order to eliminate long lines that formed in bars and pharmacies from those who wanted to make a phone call, the CTB decided to install cylindrical public telephone booths in the streets, which deteriorated in condition rapidly, as well as being bulky, leading to public vandalization due to discontent with the space they took up. In 1971, the CTB decided to address the challenge of replacing them with a design that would not only serve as a public telephone, but would also be integrated into the general aesthetic of urban areas, adapt to environmental conditions faced in Brazil such as sun and rain, and attain a sustainable cost-performance ratio.[1]

Innovation
Chu Ming Silveira created two designs for telephone booths that would meet all these requirements. Known as Chu I and Chu II, named so by the CTB in her honor, and popularly known as orelhinha, “little ear”, and orelhão, “ear”, these designs consisted of an egg-shaped booth surrounding a telephone located at the center. The egg shape of Chu Ming’s design allowed it to reflect most external noise and made the conversation converge towards the center of the parabola, where the user's ear is located, reducing interference. This design successfully minimized the space that the phone booths took up without compromising the sound quality users experienced, making them a huge success.[2]

Impact on Society Today
The cities of Rio de Janeiro and São Paulo received the first shells in January of 1972. Local residents soon created nicknames for these novelties, such as tulipa (tulip), capacete de astronauta ("astronaut helmet"), and the definitive one, orelhão. In the Jornal do Brasil, Carlos Drumond described the change that Brazilian cities experienced as such: “the street improved in São Paulo, with the appearance of the telephone helmet (…). The truth is that the street turned into something else.” 
Eventually, this design spread to a variety of South American counties, such as Peru, Colombia, and Paraguay. These telephone booths continued to be an icon of Brazilian cities until 2016, when they were retired.[4]

References

[1] Chu Ming Silveira: História DO ORELHÃO + Outros projetos. (2021, February 09). Retrieved April 07, 2021, from https://www.vivadecora.com.br/pro/arquitetos/chu-ming-silveira/
[2] I don't know her - Designer & NEUROSURGEON: Chu MING Silveira & DR. Alexa Canady on STITCHER. (2019, December 6). Retrieved April 07, 2021, from https://www.stitcher.com/show/i-dont-know-her/episode/designer-neurosurgeon-chu-ming-silveira-dr-alexa-canady-65830793
[3] Oi! in love with a BRAZILIAN ear - Graphéine. (2019, July 23). Retrieved April 07, 2021, from https://www.grapheine.com/en/graphic-design-en/oi-in-love-with-a-brazilian-ear
[4] Ramal, A. (n.d.). SILVEIRA, Chu Ming. Retrieved April 07, 2021, from https://forohistorico.coit.es/index.php/personajes/personajes-internacionales/item/silveira-chu-ming

1941 births
1997 deaths
People from Shanghai
Brazilian people of Chinese descent
Brazilian architects
C
Brazilian women architects
Chinese expatriates in Brazil
Mackenzie Presbyterian University alumni